Oleander is an unincorporated community in Fresno County, California.

A post office operated at Oleander from 1881 to 1935, moving in 1899. The name honors its first postmaster, William Oleander Johnson.

References

Unincorporated communities in California
Unincorporated communities in Fresno County, California